Colin Chisholm is a singer from Edinburgh. He was a member of Bilbo and had a UK #42 hit with them called "She's Gonna Win" and provided background vocals for the Runrig album The Big Wheel, including for the song "Hearthammer", which made #25 on the UK Singles Chart.

Hearts Squad
Chisholm has never hidden his love for football, and is a supporter of Heart of Midlothian F.C. In 1986, he lent his vocals to an updated version of "Hearts Song", which was attributed to Hearts Squad featuring Colin Chisholm and charted at #92 on the UK Singles Chart.

The Voice UK
In 2013 Chisholm's daughter, Chloe, auditioned him for the second series of The Voice UK. He passed his audition and defaulted to Team Tom, but was eliminated in the battle rounds.

References

1953 births
Living people
21st-century Scottish male singers
Musicians from Edinburgh
20th-century Scottish male singers
The Voice UK contestants